George Hemingway is the name of:

George Hemingway (cricketer), English cricketer
George Hemingway (footballer), Australian footballer